The V-100 was a projected side-by-side twin-rotor compound helicopter combat aircraft from Kamov. It had a pusher propeller located behind the rear tailplane, rotors mounted on the tips of its wings and two turbines mounted above the central fuselage, to have the aircraft exceed a projected speed of 400 km/h. Integral gun armament was planned to consist of two mobile AO-9 single barrel derivatives of the GSh-23 (one on each side) or a single fixed AO-10 (early version of the GSh-30-1). Other weapons would have included the Kh-25 missile and other stores on two high capacity fuselages and a total of six underwing hardpoints with a combined warload of up to 3000 kg. This project was abandoned and only one model of the aircraft exists.

See also

References

External links
 www.aviation.ru

1980s Soviet attack aircraft
Kamov aircraft
Kamov V-100
Abandoned military aircraft projects of the Soviet Union
Compound helicopters